William Bullitt may refer to:

William Christian Bullitt Jr. (1891–1967), American diplomat, journalist, and novelist
William Marshall Bullitt (1873–1957), lawyer, author and Solicitor General of the United States